In computing system generation or sysgen is the process of creating a particular unique instance of an operating system by combining user-specified options and parameters with manufacturer-supplied general-purpose program code to produce an operating system tailored for a particular hardware and software environment.

Some other programs have similar processes, although not usually called "sysgen."  For example, IBM's Customer Information Control System (CICS) was installed through a process called CICSGEN.

Rationale
A large general-purpose program such as an operating system has to provide support for all variations of Central processing unit (CPU) that it might be run on, for all supported main memory sizes, and for all possible configurations of input/output (I/O) equipment.  No one installation requires all this support, so system generation provides a process for selecting the options and features actually required on any one system.

Sysgen produces a system that is most efficient in terms of CPU time, main memory requirements, I/O activity, and/or disk space.  Often these parameters can be traded off, for example to generate a system that requires less memory at the expense of increased disk I/O operations.

See also
 System Generation (OS)

References

System software